VOP or Vop may refer to:

 Vop (river), a river in Smolensk Oblast, Russia
 Voice of Peace, an offshore radio station off the coast of Tel Aviv, active between 1973 and 1993. Resumed as online radio in 2009
 Voice of Prophecy, a US religious media ministry led by Shawn and Jean Boonstra
 Virginia Organizing Project, a grassroots community-empowerment organization
 Radio Voice of the People, a Zimbabwean radio station
 Violation of Probation, non-compliance with probation terms
 Voice of the People (website), South Korean online newspaper
Variation of parameters, a method to solve linear differential equations